The Great Fire of 1871 may refer to any of several large fires in the Midwestern United States that began on October 8, 1871:

 1871 Great Chicago Fire
 The Great Michigan Fire
 Port Huron Fire of 1871 in Port Huron, Michigan
 Peshtigo Fire in Wisconsin